Almila Ada Bayazıtoğlu (born August 4, 1994) is a Turkish actress, model and ballerina. She is best known for popular youth series "Adı Efsane".

Early life
Ada's father is a journalist and her mother is a fashion designer and teacher. At an early age she showed interest in ballet and took ballet lessons. Due to her mother's career demands, she lived in Russia for a while. She studied ballet and took piano lessons at Istanbul University State Conservatory for a while. Later she completed her full-time ballet education at the Mimar Sinan Fine Arts University and went to London to study ballet and performing arts. There she was encouraged by a cast director and started acting. She later got a minor role in the movie Avengers: Age of Ultron, portraying Scarlett Johansson's character in childhood as a ballerina. After this role, her interest in acting increased. As she suffered from an Achilles tendon injury and bone problem, she came to Istanbul for physical therapy.

Acting career
For a season she acted in the series Kaderimin Yazıldığı Gün. She started taking diction lessons afterwards. For a short time she was cast in the TV series Kırgın Çiçekler.

In 2017, she had leading role in the popular youth series Adı Efsane with Erdal Beşikçioğlu, Özgü Kaya.

She portrayed "Zeynep Koçak", the girlfriend of Anatolian rock star Barış Akarsu in film Barış Akarsu "Merhaba".

Apart from acting, Ada has modeled for magazines and brands such as Hollister, IQ, Vogue and InStyle.

Filmography 
Television

Film

References 

1994 births
Actresses from Istanbul
Turkish ballerinas
Turkish female models
Turkish expatriates in Russia
Turkish expatriates in England
Living people